is a Spanish-born Belgian-Japanese professional baseball player. He last played for the Chunichi Dragons.

Ishida was born to a Japanese mother and Belgian (Walloon) father in Spain, but moved to Nagoya, Aichi, Japan when he was 3 months old.

Ishida is a graduate of the Toho High School baseball program where he took over as the ace from future Dragons teammate Taisuke Maruyama. He is also a graduate of Ryukoku University.

On 26 October 2017, Ishida was selected as the 2nd draft pick in the development player round for the Chunichi Dragons at the 2017 NPB Draft and on 7 November signed a development player contract with a ¥2,000,000 moving allowance and a ¥3,000,000 yearly salary.

References

1995 births
Living people
Chunichi Dragons players
Japanese baseball players
Japanese people of Belgian descent
Nippon Professional Baseball pitchers
Baseball people from Aichi Prefecture
Sportspeople from Málaga
Spanish baseball players
Spanish people of Belgian descent
Spanish people of Japanese descent